Chris Matthews is a New Zealand rock musician. He has been a member of numerous bands, notably Children's Hour,  This Kind of Punishment and The Headless Chickens for whom he was guitarist and lead vocalist, as well as writer or co-writer of many of their songs. Among these was the 1991 single "Cruise Control", co-written by Matthews and Michael Lawry, which was voted by APRA's members as the 76th greatest New Zealand song of all time.

In 2008, he formed Chris Matthews and Robot Monkey Orchestra and released the album The Map of love, a cycle of songs based on the poems of Dylan Thomas.

Discography

With Children's Hour

 Flesh (1983) Flying Nun Records
 Ya! Ya! Ya! (1984) Flying Nun Records
 Looking For the Sun (2005) Failsafe Records

With Headless Chickens

 Stunt Clown (1988) Flying Nun Records
 Body Blow (1991) Flying Nun Records
 Greedy (1997) Flying Nun Records

With Chris Matthews & Robot Monkey Orchestra

 The Map of Love (2008) Robot Monkey Records

References

APRA Award winners
Year of birth missing (living people)
Living people
New Zealand musicians